The Netherlands Football League Championship 1940–1941 was contested by 52 teams participating in five divisions. The national champion would be determined by a play-off featuring the winners of the eastern, northern, southern and two western football divisions of the Netherlands. Heracles won its second championship this year by beating PSV Eindhoven, ADO Den Haag, Be Quick 1887 and VSV.

Divisions

Eerste Klasse East

Eerste Klasse North

Eerste Klasse South

Eerste Klasse West-I
Moving in from Division West-II: CVV Rotterdam, HBS Craeyenhout, RFC Rotterdam, VUC Den Haag and Xerxes.

Eerste Klasse West-II
Moving in from Division West-I: ADO Den haag, DWS, HVV 't Gooi, KFC and Stormvogels

Championship play-off

References
RSSSF Netherlands Football League Championships 1898-1954
RSSSF Eerste Klasse Oost
RSSSF Eerste Klasse Noord
RSSSF Eerste Klasse Zuid
RSSSF Eerste Klasse West

Netherlands Football League Championship seasons
Neth
1940–41 in Dutch football